This is a list of state parks in the U.S. state of Nebraska; the state park system is divided into state parks, state historical parks, state recreation areas and a state recreational trail.  The parks are managed by the Nebraska Game and Parks Commission.

State parks

State historical parks

State recreation areas 
Alexandria State Recreation Area
Arnold State Recreation Area
Atkinson Lake State Recreation Area
Blue River State Recreation Area
Bluestem State Recreation Area
Bowman Lake State Recreation Area
Box Butte Reservoir State Recreation Area
Branched Oak State Recreation Area
Bridgeport State Recreation Area
Brownville State Recreation Area
Buffalo Bill Ranch State Recreation Area
Calamus State Recreation Area
Champion Lake State Recreation Area
Cheyenne State Recreation Area
Conestoga State Recreation Area
Cottonmill Lake State Recreation Area
Crystal Lake State Recreation Area
Dead Timber State Recreation Area
DLD State Recreation Area
Enders Reservoir State Recreation Area
Fort Kearny State Recreation Area
Fremont Lakes State Recreation Area
Gallagher Canyon State Recreation Area
Johnson Lake State Recreation Area
Keller Park State Recreation Area
Lake Maloney State Recreation Area
Lake McConaughy State Recreation Area
Lake Minatare State Recreation Area
Lake Ogallala State Recreation Area
Lewis and Clark State Recreation Area
Long Lake State Recreation Area
Long Pine State Recreation Area
Louisville State Recreation Area
Medicine Creek State Recreation Area
Memphis State Recreation Area
Merritt Reservoir State Recreation Area
Mormon Island State Recreation Area
North Loup State Recreation Area
Olive Creek State Recreation Area
Oliver Reservoir State Recreation Area
Pawnee Lake State Recreation Area
Pelican Point State Recreation Area
Pibel Lake State Recreation Area
Pioneer State Recreation Area
Red Willow Reservoir State Recreation Area
Riverview Marina State Recreation Area
Rock Creek Lake State Recreation Area
Rock Creek Station State Recreation Area
Rockford State Recreation Area
Sandy Channel State Recreation Area
Schramm Park State Recreation Area
Sherman Reservoir State Recreation Area
Stagecoach State Recreation Area
Summit Lake State Recreation Area
Sutherland Reservoir State Recreation Area
Swanson Reservoir State Recreation Area
Two Rivers State Recreation Area
Union Pacific State Recreation Area
Verdon State Recreation Area
Victoria Springs State Recreation Area
Wagon Train State Recreation Area
Walgren Lake State Recreation Area
War Axe State Recreation Area
Wildcat Hills State Recreation Area
Willow Creek State Recreation Area
Windmill State Recreation Area

State recreational trail
Cowboy State Recreational Trail

References

External links
Nebraska State Parks Nebraska Game and Parks Commission

 
Nebraska state parks
State parks